Cottage Point is a suburb of northern Sydney, in the state of New South Wales, Australia. Cottage Point is 38 kilometres north of the Sydney central business district, in the local government area of Northern Beaches Council.

Cottage Point is located in the Ku-ring-gai Chase National Park at the confluence of Cowan Creek and Coal and Candle Creek. It is accessible by Cottage Point Road off Liberator General San Martin Drive.

References

Suburbs of Sydney
Northern Beaches Council